Plectostoma is a genus of air-breathing land snails in the family Diplommatinidae.

Species
 
 Plectostoma aethoderma (Vermeulen, 1994)
 Plectostoma anisopterum (Vermeulen, 1994)
 Plectostoma annandalei (Sykes, 1903)
 Plectostoma austeni (E. A. Smith, 1894)
 Plectostoma baritense (E. A. Smith, 1893)
 Plectostoma bihamulatum (Vermeulen, 1994)
 Plectostoma brevituba (Vermeulen, 1994)
 Plectostoma charasense (Tomlin, 1948)
 Plectostoma christae (Maassen, 2001)
 Plectostoma concinnum  (Fulton, 1901) 
 Plectostoma cookei (E. A. Smith, 1894)
 Plectostoma crassipupa  (van Benthem Jutting, 1952) 
 Plectostoma crassum (Vermeulen, 1994)
 Plectostoma cyrtopleuron (Vermeulen, 1994)
 Plectostoma dadungense  Vermeulen, Luu, Theary & Anker, 2019
 Plectostoma dancei (Vermeulen, 1994)
 Plectostoma davisoni  Liew, Vermeulen, Marzuki & Schilthuizen, 2014
 Plectostoma decrespignyi  H. Adams, 1865
 Plectostoma depauperatum (E. A. Smith, 1894)
 Plectostoma dindingensis  Liew, Vermeulen, Marzuki & Schilthuizen, 2014
 Plectostoma dipterum (Vermeulen, 1994)
 Plectostoma dormani (Vermeulen, 1994)
 Plectostoma episomon (Vermeulen, 1994)
 Plectostoma everetti (E. A. Smith, 1893)
 Plectostoma fraternum   (E. A Smith, 1905)
 Plectostoma goniostoma (Vermeulen, 1994)
 Plectostoma grandispinosum   (Godwin-Austen, 1889)
 Plectostoma heteropleuron (Vermeulen, 1994)
 Plectostoma hosei (Godwin-Austen, 1890)
 Plectostoma ikanense  Liew, Vermeulen, Marzuki & Schilthuizen, 2014
 Plectostoma inornatum (Vermeulen, 1994)
 Plectostoma jucundum (E. A. Smith, 1893)
 Plectostoma kakiense (Tomlin, 1948)
 Plectostoma kayiani  Liew, Vermeulen, Marzuki & Schilthuizen, 2014
 Plectostoma kitteli (Maassen, 2002)
 Plectostoma klongsangensis (Panha, 1997)
 Plectostoma kubuensis  Liew, Vermeulen, Marzuki & Schilthuizen, 2014
 Plectostoma laemodes (van Benthem Jutting, 1961)
 Plectostoma laidlawi (Sykes, 1902)
 Plectostoma lavillei (Dautzenberg & H. Fischer, 1906)
 Plectostoma lissopleuron (Vermeulen, 1994)
 Plectostoma lituus (Vermeulen, 1994)
 Plectostoma mengaburensis  Liew, Vermeulen, Marzuki & Schilthuizen, 2014
 Plectostoma mirabile (E. A. Smith, 1893)
 Plectostoma obliquedentatum (Vermeulen, 1994)
 Plectostoma otostoma (O. Boettger, 1893)
 Plectostoma palinhelix  (van Benthem Jutting, 1952) 
 Plectostoma panhai (Maassen, 2001)
 Plectostoma perglaber (Vermeulen, 1994)
 Plectostoma perspectivum (Vermeulen, 1994)
 Plectostoma picsingense (E. A. Smith, 1905)
 Plectostoma praeco (van Benthem Jutting, 1961)
 Plectostoma ptychodon (Vermeulen, 1994)
 Plectostoma pulchellum   (Godwin-Austen, 1890)
 Plectostoma pumilio (E. A. Smith, 1894)
 Plectostoma pyrgiscus (Vermeulen, 1994)
 Plectostoma relauensis  Liew, Vermeulen, Marzuki & Schilthuizen, 2014
 Plectostoma retrovertens (Tomlin, 1938)
 Plectostoma salpidomon  (van Benthem Jutting, 1952) 
 Plectostoma sciaphilum  (van Benthem Jutting, 1952) †
 Plectostoma senex (van Benthem Jutting, 1952) 
 Plectostoma shelfordi (E. A Smith, 1905)
 Plectostoma simplex  (Fulton, 1901) 
 Plectostoma sinyumensis (Maassen, 2001)
 Plectostoma siphonostomum  (van Benthem Jutting, 1952) 
 Plectostoma stellasubis (Vermeulen, 1994)
 Plectostoma stenotoreton (Vermeulen, 1994)
 Plectostoma tenggekensis  Liew, Vermeulen, Marzuki & Schilthuizen, 2014
 Plectostoma tohchinyawi  Liew, Vermeulen, Marzuki & Schilthuizen, 2014
 Plectostoma tonkinianum (Dautzenberg & H. Fischer, 1906)
 Plectostoma transequatorialis (Vermeulen, 1994)
 Plectostoma tuba (Vermeulen, 1994)
 Plectostoma turriforme  (van Benthem Jutting, 1952) 
 Plectostoma umbilicatum  (van Benthem Jutting, 1952) 
 Plectostoma wallacei Ancey, 1887
 Plectostoma whitteni  Liew, Vermeulen, Marzuki & Schilthuizen, 2014
 Plectostoma wilfordi (Vermeulen, 1994)

References

 Bank, R. A. (2017). Classification of the Recent terrestrial Gastropoda of the World. Last update: July 16th, 2017

External links
 Adams, H. (1865). Description of a new genus of land-shells from the Island of Labuan, Borneo. The Annals and Magazine of Natural History, including Zoology, Botany and Geology. 3(15): 177

 Diplommatinidae